Chopper is a 2000 Australian crime drama film written and directed by Andrew Dominik, in his feature directorial debut, based on the autobiographical books by criminal turned author Mark "Chopper" Read. The film stars Eric Bana as the title character and co-stars Vince Colosimo, Simon Lyndon, Kate Beahan and David Field. The film follows Read's life and time in prison. The film grossed $3.9 million worldwide and received positive reviews. It has since garnered a cult following.

Plot
In 1978 Victoria, Australia, Mark “Chopper” Read is an inmate at Pentridge Prison. Keithy George, another inmate, points to a line in the yard and tells Mark not to cross the line as it marks the Painters and Dockers territory. The next day, Mark rushes across the line and stabs Keithy multiple times.

The Painters and Dockers put out a $10,000 contract on Mark. Mark conscripts Bluey Barnes and Jimmy Loughnan to help him lead a siege on the Painters and Dockers. Wanting out of the suicide mission, Jimmy shanks Mark. Jimmy slashes his own arm so that he can claim self-defense. Mark recovers and is returned to a separate cell from Bluey and Jimmy. It's revealed that Mark is serving a 16 ½ year sentence for the attempted abduction of a judge in order to give Jimmy Loughnan freedom.

Mark meets with the Prison Board to negotiate a change of prisons for security. The board declines, so Mark has his ears cut off so that he can relocate to a mental health wing where he serves the remainder of his sentence.

When Mark is released from prison, he reunites with his old girlfriend Tanya. While out at a club, Mark flies into a jealous rage and fires several shots with a handgun. Back at Tanya’s house, Mark finds her on the phone with  Neville Bartos (Vince Colosimo). He physically abuses both Tanya and her mother. 
Mark goes to Neville’s house and learns that Neville supplies most of the cocaine to the western suburbs of Melbourne and is very wealthy. When Neville refuses to give Mark money, Mark shoots him in the abdomen.

Mark goes to Jimmy Loughnan’s apartment that he shares with his pregnant fiancée, Mandy, and their young daughter. Mark reveals that he’s working for the police, stating that he has a green light to shoot criminals and that he shot Neville. Mark tells Jimmy that he heard about the contracts out on his life and that Jimmy was meant to do them, and then holds a gun to Jimmy’s head. Eventually Mark apologizes and gives money to Jimmy.

In a parking lot at the Bojangles, Sammy the Turk, another affiliate, states that he wants to show Mark something. Mark produces a Sawed-off 410 Shotgun and after a brief argument, Mark shoots him in the eye. Mandy witnesses the murder from behind a parked car and tells Jimmy.

Mandy turns crown witness against Mark for the murder of Sammy the Turk. It’s revealed that Sammy took Mark out to the car park for Jimmy to cash in on the contract against Mark, but unknowingly took him to the wrong car park. Mark beats the murder charge but is convicted of malicious wounding of Neville Bartos, and is sentenced to 5 years.

Cast

Production
Read himself suggested that Bana play him, after seeing the actor in the sketch comedy series Full Frontal. Bana spent two days living with Read to help him practice for the role, and many of Read's friends, enemies, and old associates were interviewed. Several of Bana's meetings with Read can be viewed in the DVD Special Features.

The biggest production difficulty was being allowed to use the Pentridge Prison in Coburg, Victoria for the shooting. The prison was being closed down and while the negotiations were underway, the funding for production was delayed. This put off the starting of the shoot. Some extras were hired from former inmates and tattoo parlours.

To show the sterility of the prison and to contrast it with the world that Chopper encounters after leaving prison 16 years later, the production was split into two. The first part, filmed at the H Division of Pentridge Prison, one of the actual prisons that Chopper frequented, was as plain and sterile as could be and all the scenes in the second part, taking place in 1986, were overly coloured to achieve a paranoid and agoraphobic atmosphere called "visual overload" by the director Andrew Dominik. This was attained by lighting, choice of film stock used and colours chosen for set decoration. Part one of the production ran from 3 May until 26 May with part two continuing from 28 June until 21 July 2000. The month long break enabled Bana to put on the extra weight necessary to play the older Read.

Reception
Chopper was received with positive reviews. Review-based rating site Rotten Tomatoes gave the film a 76% "Fresh" rating from 80 critics, with its critical consensus stating "Eric Bana's performance as the charming but twisted Chopper is the highlight of this disturbing portrait about Australia's notorious author/criminal."

Roger Ebert of the Chicago Sun-Times gave the film 3 stars out of 4, praising Bana for his performance, saying, "He has a quality no acting school can teach and few actors can match." Margaret Pomeranz for SBS gave the film four-and-a-half stars out of five, commenting that what Dominik "achieved is extraordinary." David Stratton, in the same review, remarked "there's no doubting the intelligence of Andrew Dominik's direction" and declared Bana's performance as "astonishing."

Read later praised Bana's performance on the 20 to 1 episode Great Aussie Films, where Chopper came 17th.

Awards and nominations

Music
"Don't Fence Me In" – Frankie Laine
"Black  and Blue" – Chain
"Sweet Love" – Renee Geyer
"Bad Boy for Love" and "Stuck on You" – Rose Tattoo
"Forever Now" – Cold Chisel
"Release the Bats" – The Birthday Party
"Senile Dementia" – The Saints
"Ever Lovin' Man" – The Loved Ones

See also
Cinema of Australia

References

External links

BBC interview with Eric Bana on his role in Chopper.

2000 films
2000s biographical films
2000 black comedy films
2000 crime films
2000s crime comedy-drama films
2000s prison drama films
Australian black comedy films
Australian crime comedy-drama films
Biographical films about gangsters
Films based on biographies
Films based on works by Australian writers
Films about organised crime in Australia
Films directed by Andrew Dominik
Films set in Melbourne
Films set in the 1980s
Films set in the 1990s
Films shot in Melbourne
Organised crime in Melbourne
Prison comedy films
Australian vigilante films
2000 directorial debut films
2000 comedy films
2000s English-language films